The Bush Leaguer is a lost 1927 American silent comedy film directed by Howard Bretherton and starring Monte Blue and Leila Hyams. It was produced and distributed by the Warner Bros. and had a Vitaphone soundtrack of music and sound effects.

Cast
Monte Blue as Buchanan "Specs" White
Clyde Cook as Skeeter McKinnon
Leila Hyams as Alice Hobbs
William Demarest as John Gilroy
Richard Tucker as Wallace Ramsey
Burt Marshall as Stetson
Tom Dempsey as The "Parson"
Wilfred North as Stokes
William Wilson as William "Lefty" Murphy
Violet Palmer as Marie, Alice's maid
Rodney Hildebrand as Detective

See also 
List of early Warner Bros. sound and talking features

References

External links

Lobby or window card

1927 films
American silent feature films
Lost American films
Films directed by Howard Bretherton
Warner Bros. films
American black-and-white films
Transitional sound comedy films
1927 comedy films
Silent American comedy films
1920s American films